Gribiche may refer to:

 Sauce gribiche, a cold egg sauce
 Gribiche, a 1926 silent film directed by Jacques Feyder